Beachwood Canyon is the third studio album by Jem, released 5 August 2016.

Background
In January 2015, it was announced that the album would be released within the year; it was not. In January 2016, Jem published on her Facebook page the first photoshoots of the Beachwood Canyon era and announced the official release of the album for spring 2016.

Content and production
On Beachwood Canyon, Jem showcases her production skills, with the album looking to yesteryear for inspiration, and especially to the sounds of Simon & Garfunkel, The Byrds and the Beatles. The album's roots and title were established when Jem lived in LA’s renowned Beachwood Canyon – famed for being the winding road that leads to the Hollywood Sign. The majority of the album was recorded at the legendary Grandmaster Studios in Hollywood, where Stevie Wonder, wrote his seminal Songs in the Key of Life record.

Lyric videos
For the lead single, "Beachwood Canyon", Jem released lyric videos which featured the lyrics written in 13 different languages, including Welsh, German and Japanese.

Singles
The first, and only, single, "Beachwood Canyon", was released on 1 July.

Critical reception
Allan Raible for ABC News called the album "beautiful", adding that it was "an ideal listening choice for those looking for something on a mellow summer afternoon".

Track listing

References

External links

2016 albums
Albums produced by Michael Bradford
Jem (singer) albums